"Deutsche Nationalhymne" is a single by the German heavy metal band Bonfire that had not appeared on a previously released album. It was released in 2010 by the imprint LZ Records and the first release by the band under their new contract with Universal Music. The single was only available in Germany and was recorded in support for the 2010 World Cup event in South Africa for the German football team. It was a recording of the German National Anthem in a hard rock arrangement. The song managed to enter the Top 50 Songs listing in Germany and it was the first time that a National Anthem had ever entered the Top 50 of any music chart.

Track listing

Band members
Claus Lessmann – lead vocals, rhythm guitar
Hans Ziller – guitar
Chris Limburg – guitar
Uwe Köhler – bass
Dominik Huelshorst – drums, percussion

References

2010 singles
Bonfire (band) songs
2010 songs